Clutha District Council is the territorial authority for the Clutha District of New Zealand.

The council is led by the mayor of Clutha, who is currently . There are also 14 ward councillors.

Composition

Councillors

 Mayor 
 Balclutha ward: 4 seats
 Bruce ward: 3 seats
 Catlins ward: 1 seat
 Clinton ward: 1 seat
 Clutha Valley ward: 1 seat
 Kaitangata-Matau ward: 1 seat
 Lawrence-Tuapeka ward: 1 seat
 West Otago ward: 2 seats

Community boards

 Lawrence/Tuapeka Community Board: 7 members
 West Otago Community Board: 8 members

History

The council was established in 1989 through the merger of Lawrence Borough Council (established in 1866), Balclutha Borough Council (established in 1870), Clutha County Council (established in 1876), Tapanui Borough Council (established in 1876), and Kaitangata Borough Council (established in 1882).

In 2020, the council had 72 staff, including 11 earning more than $100,000. According to the Taxpayers' Union think tank, residential rates averaged $2,099.

References

External links
 Official website

Clutha District
Politics of Otago
Territorial authorities of New Zealand